Listriodon is an extinct genus of pig-like animals that lived in Eurasia during the Miocene.

Description
Listriodon species were generally small in size. In morphology, they show many similarities with peccaries rather than modern pigs.

The lophodont teeth of Listriodon indicate that it was mostly, if not strictly, herbivorous. Peculiarly, their teeth resemble those of perissodactyls such as horses more than they do that of ruminants. This was the case because unlike ruminants (and much like perissodactyls), pigs lack a complex four-chambered stomach and therefore had to rely on their teeth to break down grasses and herbs.

Species
Many species of Listriodon have been named over the years, to the point that the genus became a wastebasket taxon. Over the years, many species have been moved into new genera, such as Kubanochoerus, Bunolistriodon and Lopholistriodon. Some species were found to be synonymous with others, such as Listriodon theobaldi and Listriodon pentapotamiae representing different genders of a single species.

Prothero (2021) lists four valid species:

Listriodon splendens
Listriodon pentapotamiae
Listriodon raetamanensis
Listriodon bartuensis

Species now placed in Bunolistriodon 
Listriodon akatikubas
Listriodon guptai
Listriodon intermedius
Listriodon latidens
Listriodon lockharti
Listriodon meidamon

Species now placed in Lopholistriodon 
Listriodon juba

Species now placed in Kubanochoerus 
Listriodon robustus

Species synonymous with L. splendens 
Listriodon aragoniensis
Listriodon mongoliensis
Listriodon lishanensis
Listriodon xinanensis

Species synonymous with L. pentapotamiae 
Listriodon theobaldi

External links
 Listriodon at Fossilworks

References

Prehistoric Suidae
Miocene even-toed ungulates
Fossil taxa described in 1846
Prehistoric even-toed ungulate genera
Miocene mammals of Europe
Miocene mammals of Asia